John J. Wood (born January 23, 1952 in Morristown, New Jersey) is an American former racing driver. He began his career in sports car racing, then ventured briefly into open wheel racing from 1978 to 1980, then returned to sports cars.

After finishing 5th in the USAC Formula Super Vee standings in 1978 with a win at Trenton Speedway, Wood moved up to the CART/USAC Championship Car series in 1980 with Mergard Racing. He made his debut at the Ontario Motor Speedway and finished a respectable 12th place. He then failed to qualify for the 1980 Indianapolis 500. He returned in July to race on the Mid-Ohio Sports Car Course but crashed out on the first lap. He then failed to qualify for the fall race at the Milwaukee Mile and his Champ Car adventure was over.

He returned to sports car racing, including both the World Sportscar Championship and the Trans Am Series. Although he never won a major race, he competed in the 24 Hours of Daytona several times.

Racing record

Complete USAC Mini-Indy Series results

External links
John Wood at ChampCarStats.com
 

1952 births
24 Hours of Daytona drivers
Champ Car drivers
Living people
People from Morristown, New Jersey
Racing drivers from New Jersey
Sportspeople from Morris County, New Jersey
Trans-Am Series drivers